Coote is a surname. Notable people with the surname include:

Adrian Coote, British footballer
Ali Coote, Scottish footballer
Alice Coote, British mezzo-soprano
Algernon Coote, 6th Earl of Mountrath (1689-1744)
Andrea Coote, Australian politician
Anthony Coote, English musician 
 Baron Coote
 Sir Charles Coote, 1st Baronet (1581-1642)
 Charles Coote, 1st Earl of Mountrath (1610-1661)
 Charles Coote, 7th Earl of Mountrath (1725-1802)
 Charles Coote, 1st Earl of Bellomont (1738-1800)
 Charles Coote, 2nd Baron Castle Coote (1754-1823)
Charles Henry Coote (1840–1899), librarian at the British Museum.
The Coote baronets:
Eyre Coote (disambiguation)
Fiona Coote, Australian heart transplant patient
George Gibson Coote, Canadian politician
Henry Coote, 5th Earl of Mountrath (1684-1720)
 Henry Coote (1819-1867), Army officer, artist and New Zealand runholder 
Jack Coote, Australian rugby league footballer
John Coote (1936-2017), British Physiologist
John Methuen Coote (1878–1967), British colonial administrator
Ken Coote, English footballer
Lachlan Coote, Australian rugby league footballer
Michelle Coote Australian chemist
Richard Coote, 1st Earl of Bellomont (1636-1701)
 Robert Coote (Royal Navy officer) (1820-1898)
Robert Coote, English actor
 Roderic Coote (1915-2000), British Anglican bishop
Ron Coote, Australian rugby league footballer
Steve Coote, English darts player

See also
Coote Synge-Hutchinson, British Army officer
Edward Coote Pinkney, American writer, lawyer, sailor and professor
"The Long Arm of Looney Coote", a short story by P. G. Wodehouse
R. v. Coote, a decision of the Judicial Committee of the Privy Council dealing with Canadian constitutional law.
Cootes
Coot (disambiguation)